Goerkemia is a monotypic genus of flowering plants belonging to the family Brassicaceae. It contains just one species, Goerkemia turcica 

It is native to Turkey.

Its genus name of Goerkemia is in honour of Görkem Yıldırımlı (20th and 21st centuries), a Turkish plant collector and son of the botanist Şinasi Yıldırımlı (b. 1949); they both founded a herbarium. It was first described and published in Ot Sist. Bot. Dergisi Vol.6 Issue 2 on page 2 in (1999.  publ. 2000).

References

Brassicaceae
Brassicaceae genera
Plants described in 2000
Flora of Turkey